The Laff Stop was a comedy club, with locations in Texas and California.

History and venues
The Laff Stop was created by Michael Callie and originated in Newport Beach, California and featured comics such as Steve Martin, David Letterman, Bill Hicks and Robin Williams.  There were also Laff Stop clubs in Montclair, California Palm Springs, CA and Austin, Texas (which changed its name to Cap City Comedy Club in 1996).

The location in Houston, Texas was open since 1977, and was one of the most successful clubs through the 1990s. It closed on December 19, 2009, in a surprise announcement.  The Houston Laff Stop changed locations a few times during its existence, the last stop becoming an upstairs strip mall location at Waugh and Allen Parkway.  The previous location on West Gray Street is now a bar called Local Pour. The club later served as a starting point and hometown club for such acts as Ralphie May and Brett Butler.

In media
Albums and videos recorded at the Laff Stop include:

 Mitch Hedberg's Strategic Grill Locations CD: recording of a performance at The Laff Stop comedy club in Houston, Texas from September 7, 1999
 Dane Cook's Harmful If Swallowed CD/DVD
 Joe Rogan's I'm Gonna Be Dead Someday... CD
 Doug Stanhope's Sicko and Something to Take the Edge Off
 Ron White's Drunk in Public CD
 Louis CK's "Live in Houston"
 Bill Hicks "Sane Man"

References

External links
 Cap City Comedy (former Laff Stop in Austin, Texas)

Culture of Houston
Defunct comedy clubs in the United States